Guy is a French and English given name, which is derived from the French form of the Italian and Germanic name Guido. Unrelated to this, Guy is also an Anglicization of the Hebrew name , which means "ravine".

People

Religious figures
 Saint Vitus, also known as Saint Guy, early Christian martyr
 Guy (bishop of Amiens) (died 1075), eleventh-century churchman
 Guy of Anderlecht (950–1012), Belgian Christian saint
 Guy of Avesnes (1253–1317), Bishop of Utrecht

Nobility
 Guy I (disambiguation)
 Guy II (disambiguation)
 Guy III (disambiguation)
 Guy, Count of Flanders (c. 1226–1305), Guy of Dampierre
 Guy, Count of Nevers (died 1176), count of Nevers and Auxerre
 Guy of Hauteville (died 1108), Duke of Amalfi
 Guy of Ibelin (disambiguation)
 Guy of Ivrea (940–965), Margrave of Ivrea
 Guy of Lusignan (died 1194), King of Jerusalem and later King of Cyprus
 Guy of Lusignan, Count of Angoulême (c. 1260/1265–1308), ending of the senior male line of the House of Lusignan
 Guy de Montfort, Count of Bigorre (died 1220), son of Simon de Montfort, 5th Earl of Leicester
 Guy de Montfort, Count of Nola (1244–1288), son of Simon de Montfort, 6th Earl of Leicester and Eleanor of England
 Guy de Montfort, Lord of Sidon (died 1228), younger son of Simon III de Montfort and Amicia, sister of Robert FitzPernel, Earl of Leicester
 Guy of Nantes (died before 819), warden of the Breton March
 Guy, Margrave of Tuscany (died 929), also Count and Duke of Lucca
 Guy, Duke of Sorrento (c. 1012–?), the duke of Sorrento from 1035
 Guy IV of Spoleto (died 897), Duke of Spoleto and Camerino and Prince of Benevento; son of Guy II of Spoleto
 Guy of Thouars (died 1213), third husband of Constance, Duchess of Brittany, and regent of Brittany

Sports
 Guy Abrahams (born 1953), Panamanian runner
 Guy Accoceberry (born 1967), former French rugby union footballer
 Guy Akpagba (born 1990), Beninese footballer
 Guy Allen (born 1958), ProRodeo Hall of Fame cowboy
 Guy Amouretti (1925–2011), male French international table tennis player
 Guy Azouri (born 1963), Israeli football manager
 Guy Barnea (born 1987), Israeli Olympic swimmer
 Guy Barrabino (1934–2017), French fencer
 Guy Basquet (1921–2006), French rugby union player
 Guy Benjamin (born 1955), former American football quarterback
 Guy Callaghan (born 1970), New Zealand butterfly swimmer
 Guy Carbonneau (born 1960), retired French-Canadian hockey player and former NHL head coach
 Guy Charron (born 1949), retired French Canadian hockey player and former NHL head coach
 Guy Chouinard (born 1956), retired French Canadian hockey player
 Guy Forget (born 1965), retired French tennis player
 Guy Goodes (born 1971), Israeli basketball player and coach
 Guy Hebert (born 1967), retired American hockey goalie
 Guy Lafleur (1951–2022), French Canadian Hall of Fame hockey player
 Guy Lapébie (1916–2010), French cyclist
 Guy Lapointe (born 1948), retired French Canadian Hall of Fame hockey player
 Guy Murray, American track/cross country coach and former marathon runner
 Guy Nosbaum (1930–1996), French Olympic medalist rower
 Guy Palatin (born 2000), Israeli basketball player
 Guy Pnini (born 1983), Israeli basketball player
 Guy Roux (born 1938), French football player and manager of AJ Auxerre (1961–2008)
 Guy Starik (born 1965), Israeli Olympic sport shooter
 Guy Toindouba (born 1988), Cameroonian football midfielder
 Guy Turnbow (1908–1975), American football player
 Guy Whittall (born 1972), retired Zimbabwean cricket player
 Guy Whittingham (born 1964), British footballer

Other
 Guy Adami (born 1963), American television TV personality
 Guy Adams (born 1976), English author, comedian, and actor
 Guy Aitchison (born 1968), tattoo artist and a painter born in Michigan
 Guy Alexis Lobineau (1666–1727), Breton historian and Benedictine monk
 Guy Allison (born 1959), American composer, pianist, and producer
 Guy Anderson (1906–1998), American painter
 Guy André (born 1959), member of the Canadian House of Commons
 Guy André Boy (born 1952), French and American scientist and engineer
 Guy Andrews, American television writer
 Guy Arkins (1888–1980), Australian politician
 Guy Arnold (1932–2020), British author
 Guy Aroch, Israeli-American fashion and celebrity photographer
 Guy Arvely Dolsin (born 1957), Malagasy politician
 Guy Babylon (1956–2009), keyboardist/composer
 Guy Bacon (1936–2018), politician in Quebec, Canada
 Guy Bailey (born 1950), president of Texas Tech University
 Guy Bainbridge (1867–1943), British Army officer during the First World War
 Guy Bavli (born 1971), Israeli mentalist, illusionist, and lecturer
 Guy Beahm (born 1982), pro gamer, mainly known by his gamer tag Dr DisRespect
 Guy Beatty (1870–1954), officer in the British Indian Army
 Guy Bedarida (born 1963), Italian-born French jewelry designer
 Guy Bedos (1934–2020), actor and stand-up comedian
 Guy Beiner (born 1968), historian of the late-modern period
 Guy Bellamy (1935–2015), English author known for humorous novels
 Guy Ben-Ari (born 1984), Israeli painter
 Guy Ben-Ner (born 1969), Israeli video artist
 Guy Bennett (born 1960), poet/translator and author
 Guy Benson (born 1985), American political commentator and pundit
 Guy Berryman (born 1978), Scottish musician of Coldplay
 Guy Bertrand (broadcaster) (born 1954), French Canadian linguist and radio/TV personality
 Guy Bolton (1884–1979), Anglo-American playwright
 Guy Boyd (1923–1988), Australian sculptor
 Guy Boyd (born 1943), American actor
 Guy Branum (born 1975), American comedian
 Guy Burgess (1911–1963), Soviet double agent, one of the Cambridge Five spy ring
 Guy Burnet (born 1983), English actor who played Craig Dean on the soap opera Hollyoaks
 Guy Busick, American film and television screenwriter
 Guy Chambers (born 1963), British songwriter of Robbie Williams fame
 Guy Clark (1941–2016), American singer-songwriter
 Guy Consolmagno (born 1952), American Jesuit brother and astronomer
 Guy de Maupassant (1850–1893), French writer and journalist
 Guy de Rothschild (1909–2007), French banker
 Guy Debord (1931–1994), French author and filmmaker, Situationist
 Guy Distad, American television director
 Guy Drake (1904–1984), American singer and comedian
 Guy Waldo Dunnington (1906–1974), American biographer, professor, and translator
 Guy Fawkes (1570–1606), English Catholic famed for his involvement in the Gunpowder Plot
 Guy Fieri (born 1968), American chef, restaurateur, and television personality
 Guy Fletcher (born 1960), English musician of Dire Straits and Mark Knopfler's solo band
 Guy Garvey (born 1974), English musician. Singer and principal songwriter of the alternative rock band Elbow
 Guy Gavriel Kay (born 1954), Canadian fantasy writer
 Guy Gibson (1918–1944), British Second World War pilot awarded the Victoria Cross
 Guy Gillette (1879–1973), former U.S. Senator from Iowa
 Guy Goma (born 1969), who gained fame when he was accidentally interviewed on BBC
 Guy Hamilton (1922–2016), British film director
 Guy Harvey (born 1955), Jamaican marine wildlife artist and conservationist
 Guy Kawasaki (born 1954), American former Apple employee and venture capitalist
 Guy Kent (born 1989), American actor and producer
 Guy Kewney (1946–2010), British journalist
 Guy Kibbee (1882–1956), American actor
 Guy Laliberté (born 1959), Canadian businessman, founder and CEO of Cirque du Soleil
 Guy Le Borgne (1920–2007), French paratroop general
 Guy Le Jaouen (1933–2014), French politician
 Guy Lombardo (1902–1977), Canadian-American bandleader and musician
 Guy Madison (1922–1996), American actor
 Guy-Manuel de Homem-Christo (born 1974), French musician, record producer, singer, songwriter, DJ and film director
 Guy Marchand (born 1937), French actor, musician and singer
 Guy Martin (born 1981), British motorcycle racer, truck mechanic and TV personality
 Guy McAfee (1888–1960), owner of gambling saloons and brothels in Los Angeles, California and casinos in Las Vegas, Nevada
 Guy Mitchell (1927–1999), American singer and actor
 Guy Molinari (1928–2018), former US Representative from New York
 Guy Mollet (1905–1975), former prime minister of France
 Guy Moon (born 1962), film and television composer
 Guy Oseary (born 1972), Israeli American businessman
 Guy Pearce (born 1967), English-born Australian actor
 Guy Perry, American actor
 Guy Picciotto (born 1965), of the band Fugazi
 Guy Pratt (born 1962), British session musician
 Guy Randrianarisoa (born 1962), Malagasy politician
 Guy Ritchie (born 1968), British film director, formerly married to Madonna
 Guy B. Roberts, American government official, lawyer, and retired United States Marine Corps colonel
 Guy Sebastian (born 1981), singer and winner of the first Australian Idol
 Bryan Guy Adams (born 1959), Canadian singer
 Guy Severin (1926–2008), former director of NPP Zvezda
 Guy Simonds (1903–1974), Canadian major general
 Guy Siner (born 1947), American-born English actor known for portraying Hubert Gruber in the sitcom 'Allo 'Allo!
 Guy Standing (1873–1937), English actor
 Guy Standing (economist) (born 1948), British economist
 Guy L. Steele Jr. (born 1954), American computer scientist and designer of the Scheme programming language
 Guy Talarico (born 1955), American state politician
 Guy Trosper (1911–1963), American screenwriter
 Guy Verhofstadt (born 1953), Prime Minister of Belgium (1999–2008)
 Guy Waggoner (1883–1950), American rancher and business executive
 Guy Warren (1923–2008), also known as Kofi Ghanaba, Ghanaian musician
 Guy Weill (1914–2006), Swiss-born American art collector
 Guy Wetmore Carryl (1873–1904), American author and poet
 Guy Whatley (born 1975), American organist

Fictional characters
The Guy, a character in the film Spy Kids 3-D: Game Over
 Guy, a character from the video game Fire Emblem: The Blazing Blade
 Guy, a character from the Final Fight and Street Fighter series
 Guy, a character in The Croods franchise
 Guy, one of the four main player characters in Final Fantasy II
 Guy, a hero of the First Doom Island War in the Lufia series
 Guy, the protagonist of the 2021 film Free Guy
 Guy of Gisbourne, a villain in the Robin Hood legend
 Guy of Warwick, a legendary English hero
 Guy Caballero, a character in the Canadian sketch comedy TV series SCTV
 Guy Cecil, one of the main characters in the video game Tales of the Abyss
 Guy Crouchback, the main protagonist in Sword of Honour
Guy Diamond, a character in Trolls: The Beat Goes On!
 Guy Fleegman, a character in Galaxy Quest
 Guy Forcas, a character in the 2009 Ubisoft game Anno 1404
 Guy Francon, a character in the novel The Fountainhead
 Guy Gagné, a character in Turbo
 Guy Gardner, a DC Comics character
Guy Germaine, a character in The Mighty Ducks franchise
 Guy Haines, the main protagonist of the 1951 Hitchcock murder mystery film Strangers on a Train
 Guy Hamdon, the main protagonist of the Australian animated series SheZow
 Guy Hastings, a character in the series Alcatraz
 Guy LeDouche, the name used for the Takeshi's Castle character Junji Inagawa on that series' American parody/adaptation MXC
 Guy Malton, from C. J. Sansom's Matthew Shardlake novels
 Guy Marriott, spy in the Australian radio serial Undercover
 Guy Montag, a character in the Ray Bradbury novel Fahrenheit 451
 Guy Noir, a character in A Prairie Home Companion
 Guy Patterson, a character in That Thing You Do!
 Guy Secretan, a character in the British sitcom Green Wing
 Guy Smiley, a Muppet character from Sesame Street
 Guy Spelunky, the main character from the video game Spelunky
 Guy Thierrault, the second Marvel Comics supervillain known as Flag-Smasher
 Might Guy, a character from the anime/manga series Naruto

See also
 Guido
 Gaetano
 Guy (disambiguation)
 Guy (surname)

References

French masculine given names
English masculine given names